Rapanea platystigma is a flowering plant in the family Primulaceae. The specific epithet comes from the Greek platys (“broad”) and stigma, with reference to the relatively broad stigma.

Description
It is a shrub or small tree, growing to 3–6 m in height. The oblanceolate elliptic leaves are 3.5–7 cm long and 1–2.5 cm wide. The tiny flowers are greenish white, spotted and streaked reddish brown. The small round fruits are 3.5–4 mm in diameter and purple when ripe.

Distribution and habitat
The plant is endemic to Australia’s subtropical Lord Howe Island in the Tasman Sea, where it is widespread and commonly found from the lowlands to an elevation of about 400 m.

References

platystigma
Endemic flora of Lord Howe Island
Ericales of Australia
Plants described in 1873
Taxa named by Ferdinand von Mueller